North Carolina State Fair station is a seasonal Amtrak station serving the North Carolina State Fairground in Raleigh, North Carolina. It is served by Amtrak's Carolinian and Piedmont trains when the fair is in operation in mid-October. The station waiting area is a covered tent on the west corner of Blue Ridge Road and south corner of Hillsborough Street. Tickets are sold online, at an Amtrak staffed station, by mobile app or by paying cash to the conductor if seats are available. A wheelchair lift located near the grade crossings provides accessibility for disabled passengers.

Across the tracks from the fairgrounds is an abandoned freight spur leading to what is today a North Carolina Department of Transportation equipment storage facility along Beryl Road, as well as another one leading to what is now a storage warehouse. Sidetracks exist on both sides of the tracks between Powell Drive and Blue Ridge Road.

References

External links

N.C. State Fair Station – NC By Train

Amtrak stations in North Carolina
Buildings and structures in Raleigh, North Carolina
Transportation in Raleigh, North Carolina
Stations along Southern Railway lines in the United States